Taichung City Dragon FC is a football club from Taiwan Taipei, also called Republic of China. It is one of the main association football clubs in Taiwan Taipei.

External links

Taichung City Dragon FC logo
Dragon FC at Soccerway

Football clubs in Taiwan